Created for the 16th Saskatchewan general election as "Regina South East", this constituency was redrawn and renamed "Regina Wascana" in 1971. It was dissolved in 1991.

Members of the Legislative Assembly

Election results 

|-
 
| style="width: 130px" |Progressive Conservative
|Gordon Martin
|align="right"|5,176
|align="right"|41.75
|align="right"|-18.66
 
|NDP
|Bob Goos
|align="right"|5,121
|align="right"|41.30
|align="right"|+6.59

|- bgcolor="white"
!align="left" colspan=3|Total
!align="right"|12,398
!align="right"|100.00
!align="right"|

|-
 
| style="width: 130px" |Progressive Conservative
|Gord Currie
|align="right"|5,976
|align="right"|60.41
|align="right"|+26.93
 
|NDP
|Clint White
|align="right"|3,434
|align="right"|34.71
|align="right"|-10.68

|- bgcolor="white"
!align="left" colspan=3|Total
!align="right"|9,893
!align="right"|100.00
!align="right"|

|-
 
| style="width: 130px" |NDP
|Clint White
|align="right"|3,993
|align="right"|45.39
|align="right"|+13.71
 
|Progressive Conservative
|Allan W. Wagar
|align="right"|2,945
|align="right"|33.48
|align="right"|+12.65

|- bgcolor="white"
!align="left" colspan=3|Total
!align="right"|8,797
!align="right"|100.00
!align="right"|

|-

 
|NDP
|Agnes Groome
|align="right"|2,752
|align="right"|31.68
|align="right"|-20.12
 
|Prog. Conservative
|Roy A. Rudichuk
|align="right"|1,810
|align="right"|20.83
|align="right"|-
|- bgcolor="white"
!align="left" colspan=3|Total
!align="right"|8,688
!align="right"|100.00
!align="right"|

|-
 
| style="width: 130px" |NDP
|Henry Baker
|align="right"|4,513
|align="right"|51.80
|align="right"|+3.69

|- bgcolor="white"
!align="left" colspan=3|Total
!align="right"|8,712
!align="right"|100.00
!align="right"|

|-
 
| style="width: 130px" |NDP
|Henry Baker
|align="right"|5,893
|align="right"|48.11
|align="right"|*

 
|Prog. Conservative
|Bill Barry
|align="right"|896
|align="right"|7.31
|align="right"|*
|- bgcolor="white"
!align="left" colspan=3|Total
!align="right"|12,250
!align="right"|100.00
!align="right"|

References 

Former provincial electoral districts of Saskatchewan